The discography of Five Iron Frenzy, a Denver, Colorado-based Christian ska band, consists of seven studio albums, two live albums, two compilations and two EPs, among other releases.

Studio albums

EPs

Live albums

Compilation albums

7" vinyl

Singles

Videography

Video releases

Music videos

Other appearances

Compilation appearances

References

Discographies of American artists
Rock music group discographies
Christian music discographies